Erik Mikhaylovich Galimov (29 July 1936 – 24 November 2020) was a Russian geochemist and Doctor of Sciences.

Early life
Galimov was born in Vladivostok. He graduated from the Gubkin Russian State University of Oil and Gas in 1959. In 1965, he defended his Candidate's Dissertation. In 1970, he defended his doctoral dissertation. In 1982, he received the title of Professor.

Career 
He was Editor-in-Chief of the Russian journal Geochemistry (since 2005). He was also academician of the Russian Academy of Sciences (since 1994), a Distinguished Professor at the Lomonosov Moscow State University (since 1999), and director of the Vernadsky Institute of Geochemistry and Analytical Chemistry, RAS (1992—2015).

Awards and honors 
He was elected an Honorary Member of the Academy of Sciences of the Republic of Bashkortostan in 2002.
He was elected a Foreign Member of the Akademie der Wissenschaften und der Literatur in 1998. He received the Alfred E. Treibs Award from the Geochemical Society in 2004.
He was a Geochemistry Fellow in the Geochemical Society and European Association of Geochemistry (1998). He was also a laureate of the 2015 State Prize of the Russian Federation.

Death 
He died on 24 November 2020, aged 84 from COVID-19.

References

1936 births
2020 deaths
Russian geochemists
Russian professors
Soviet professors
Full Members of the Russian Academy of Sciences
State Prize of the Russian Federation laureates
Deaths from the COVID-19 pandemic in Russia